Model Citizen is an EP by American pop punk band Meet Me at the Altar. It is their first to be release through major record label Fueled by Ramen, and was released on August 13, 2021.

Background and recording
After releasing a series of independent EPs, the last being 2019's Bigger Than Me, the band went viral in 2020, partially in part of receiving public endorsements of pop punk veterans Alex Gaskarth of All Time Low and Dan Campbell of The Wonder Years. The band was signed to pop punk and emo record label Fueled by Ramen. After releasing a few stand alone singles through the label, including a re-release of their track "Garden" and the song "Hit Like a Girl", the band began work on their debut EP for the label. Recording for the EP began in March 2021. Johnson noted that the band intended to maintain true to their established sound despite signing to a major label, while at the same time creating a new sense of maturity in the music. The release was originally going to be an entirely separate set of songs, but the band threw out the recordings day before the EP submission date imposed by the label, in favor of writing a new set of songs with greater cohesion.

Themes and composition
The band described the sound of the EP as "heavy easycore". The track "Feel a Thing" opens up with electronic notes reminiscent of 1980s video games, before moving into distorted guitar riffs come in matching the same notes, while the song progresses into upbeat and optimistic vocals, large drum beats, and fast guitar work. The A.V. Club noted the song had heavier guitar than their prior songs, but that it still had a pop-punk styled chorus. The EP has been seen for blending 2010s pop and punk rock alongside their easycore sound.

Release and promotion
On June 16, 2021, the EP's name, Model Citizen, and its release date, August 13, was announced. On the same day of the announcement, the band released the first single, "Feel a Thing". An accompanying music video, themed around video games and arcades, was released concurrently. A second song, "Brighter Days (Are Before US)" was also released prior to the EP's release, and the band debuted the two tracks, and a third, "Now or Never", live for the NME's "Home Sessions".

The band is scheduled to tour in support of the album with a North American tour with The Used and Coheed and Cambria from late August through the end of the year.

Critical reception

Model Citizen was released to critical acclaim. On Metacritic, it holds a score of 85 out of 100, indicating "universal acclaim", based on seven reviews. NME praised the album, concluding that "The pop-punk revival so far may have platformed big-budget solo artists – including Willow [Smith], Machine Gun Kelly, and Olivia Rodrigo – but with ‘Model Citizen’, Meet Me @ The Altar prove there is still nothing quite like rocking out with your best mates, and confronted with the burden that they are what so many needed as younger fans, the weight on their shoulders could have been too heavy to bare. But to constantly tie them to the regrets of yesteryear is to deny what is painfully obvious; ‘Model Citizen’ is the work of a band who are absolutely for the now.

Track listing
Adapted from Exclaim!

Personnel
Adapted from Consequence.
 Edith Johnson - vocals
 Tea Campbell - guitar, bass
 Ada Juarez - drums

References

Fueled by Ramen EPs
Pop punk EPs
2021 EPs